The Queen's Prize pairs event took place on 25 and 26 July 2014 at the Barry Buddon Shooting Centre. The winners were determined by the number of points each team had at the end of the second day.

Results

References

Shooting at the 2014 Commonwealth Games